Mesillat Yesharim or Mesillas Yeshorim (lit. "Path of the Upright") is an ethical (musar) text composed by the influential Rabbi Moshe Chaim Luzzatto (1707–1746). It is different from Luzzato's other writings, which are more philosophical.

Mesillat Yesharim was written and published in Amsterdam. The earliest known manuscript version, written in 1738, was arranged as a dialogue between a hakham (wise man) and a hasid (pious person). Before publication, it was rearranged to have only one speaker. The dialogue version often sheds light on the more well-known version.

Mesillat Yesharim is probably Luzzato's most influential work, widely learned in virtually every yeshiva since formal study of musar texts was introduced to the yeshiva curriculum by the Mussar Movement of Rabbi Yisroel Salanter.

Aim of the work
The aim of this work extends beyond the achievement of the perfection of human character in Divine service.  Its stated aim is to remind the reader of one's deepest obligations in this regard, as well as to encourage the centrality of the deep study of this subject matter in one's daily life.  Unlike many other musar books, which are ordered according to the authors' own lists of character traits, Luzzato builds his work on a Beraita in the name of the sage Pinchas ben Yair, whose list goes in order of accomplishment:

"Rabbi Pinchas ben Yair said: Torah leads to watchfulness; watchfulness leads to alacrity; alacrity leads to cleanliness; cleanliness leads to abstention; abstention leads to purity; purity leads to piety; piety leads to humility; humility leads to fear of sin; fear of sin leads to holiness; holiness leads to prophecy; prophecy leads to the resurrection of the dead".

Within each step, Luzzatto explains the step itself, its elements, how it can be acquired, and what might detract from its acquisition. For example: Watchfulness can be acquired by setting aside time for introspection, and acquiring watchfulness can be impaired by excessive mundane responsibilities, wrong company or a cynical stance in life. The same pattern is used for every single one of the traits mentioned.

Outline

 Introduction
 Man's General Duty in His World (Ch. 1)
 Watchfulness (zehirut) (Ch. 2-5)
 Alacrity (zerizut) (Ch. 6-9)
 Cleanliness (of sin, nekiyut) (Ch. 10-12)
 Abstention (of improper practices, perishut) (Ch. 13-15)
 Purity (tahara) (Ch. 16-17)
 Piety (chassidut) (Ch. 18-21)
 Humility (anava) (Ch. 22-23)
 Fear of sin (yirat chet) (Ch. 24-25)
 Holiness (kedusha) (Ch. 26-27)
 Epilogue

Influence
Mesillat Yesharim is perhaps the most important Jewish ethical text of the post-Middle Ages period. The Vilna Gaon is reported to have commented that he couldn't find a superfluous word in the first eleven chapters of the work, and stated that he would have traveled to meet the author and learn from his ways if he'd still been alive. These and similar pronouncements largely cleared Luzzato from misgivings by others as to his suspected Sabbatean leanings.

Text, translations, and commentaries
 Complete Messillat Yesharim online
Hebrew original
English translation
 Translations
 Luzzatto, Moses Hayyim. Messillat Yesharim: The Path of the Upright; translated by Mordecai Kaplan from the critical edition.  Philadelphia: Jewish Publication Society. .
 Luzzato, Rabbi Moshe Chayim. Mesillas Yeshorim; translated by Rav. Yaakov Bar Yosef. Netzari Faith Publishers. .
 Luzzato, Rabbi Moshe Chayim. Mesillas Yeshorim; translated by Yosef Leiber. New York: Feldheim Publishers. .
 Luzzato, Rabbi Moshe Chayim. The Path of the Just; translated by Yaakov Feldman. New York: Jason Aronson Publishers. .
 Luzzato, Rabbi Moshe Chayim. The Complete Mesillat Yesharim; translated by Avraham Shoshana and associates. Cleveland: Ofeq Institute. .
 Commentaries on Messilllat Yesharim
 Ira F. Stone's commentary, included in the new Jewish Publication Society edition of the book.
 Hillel, Yaakov Moshe. Ascending the Path: Insights Into Mesillat Yesharim. Jerusalem: Yeshivat Hevrat Ahavat Shalom. 7 vol
 Ohr La'Yesharim  on Mesilat Yesharim with a compendium of commentaries and explanations by great rabbis from the Musar Movement.
 Mesilat Yesharim with commentary Sod L'Yesharim, a compendium of commentaries and explanations from other books by the Ramchal.
 Mandelbaum, Alexander Aryeh. Bam'silah Naale.
 Bilvavi Mishkan Evneh on Mesilias Yesharim

References

Jewish philosophical and ethical texts
1740 books
Hebrew-language religious books
Sifrei Kodesh